Dofleinia armata, commonly known as the striped anemone or armed anemone, is a species of sea anemone in the family Actiniidae. It is the only species in the genus Dofleinia.

Description
Dofleinia armata is one of Australia's largest species of anemone. It can grow to 20 cm in diameter, with tentacles up to 50 cm long.

The base of this species is broad, the column smooth, with a broad, flat oral disc. It has long inner tentacles which are a minimum of double the size of the outer tentacles. The tentacles have visible papillae on the surface. These contain nematocysts that are very large. The oral disc has papillae as well, but weaker. These contain nematocysts also.

The surface of the tentacles end in a tip that is somewhat swollen. The tentacles are either cream, brown, or plain, and are striped. They have a surface that is scale-like and are often observed curling into ball shapes that hide the mouth.

It is able to expand its body and tentacles due to a well-developed hydrostatic system.

Distribution
This species is known to live in the tropical waters of Australia as far south as Perth, Western Australia. It is also known to occur in the Philippines and Indonesia.

Habitat
This species lives at depths of up to 20 metres in the intertidal zone on sloping, sheltered reefs, as well as in mangroves. It may be found in fine silt or mud.

Danger to humans
The sting of Dofleinia armata presents a danger to humans. Injuries resulting from contact with this species are considered very painful, and can take several months to heal.

References

Further reading
Coleman, N. (1977) A Field Guide to Australian Marine Life. Rigby Limited, Adelaide, 223 pp.
Fautin, D.G. (2003) Hexacorallians of the World. https://archive.today/20120604092440/http://hercules.kgs.ku.edu/hexacoral/anemone2/index.cfm
Edgar, G.J. (1997) Australian Marine Life: the plants and animals of temperate waters. Reed Books, Kew, 544 pp.

External links
 

Actiniidae
Monotypic cnidarian genera
Cnidarians of the Indian Ocean
Cnidarians of the Pacific Ocean
Animals described in 1908